MTX Audio is an American consumer audio company that manufactures sound equipment for applications including car audio, home audio, marine audio and live sound products. They are best known for their car audio products and they specialize in subwoofers and subwoofer amplifiers.

MTX Audio is a brand name owned by the Mitek Corporation.

History
MTX audio was called Matrecs in 1979. The MTX name came in when Loyd Ivey, then owner of his own company American Acoustic Labs, bought out the Matrecs name in 1979 and changed it to MTX under Ivey’s parent company Mitek. In 1991, MTX Audio acquired Soundcraftsmen, a defunct audio equipment manufacturer which was located in Santa Ana, California, and was called MTX Soundcraftsmen until 1999. 
In 1984 MTX created the first mobile audio enclosure.

Today
Loyd Ivey is chairman and CEO of MiTek and therefore MTX, which employs over 750 people. MiTek has 12 other companies including MTX, with plants in Ennis, Texas, Louisville, Kentucky, Monroe, Wisconsin, West Dundee, Illinois, Winslow, Illinois, and in Phoenix, Arizona.

List of global brand names and what countries MiTek has their products/facilities in.
 MTX- USA, Europe, Germany
 COUSTIC- USA, Europe
 Xtant- USA, Europe
 StreetWires- USA, Europe
 Mitek- USA, Europe
 Atlas IED- USA, Europe

Parent company
Loyd Ivey Is the president and CEO of his company MiTek corp which he founded in the mid-1980s after acquiring Matrecs and the American Case Company. MiTek is the parent company of 13 other companies, including MTX, with manufacturing plants in seen American states and three countries around the world.

Products
MTX makes  car audio, marine audio, ATV-UTV Audio, home audio, and portable audio products. The MTX Jackhammer 24 is a 24-inch square subwoofer and one of the largest available on the consumer market.

References

External links

Does Walmart Install Car Stereos?
Mitek on International Trade by Loyd Ivey on YouTube

Electronics companies established in 1979
Audio equipment manufacturers of the United States